The Iraq Division Two is a football league that is the third tier of the Iraqi football league system. The league consists of 126 teams and was founded in 1974.

League format 
The Division Two consists of 126 teams divided into groups. The top 2 teams are promoted to the Division One.

Current members 2021

Erbil Province League

Sulaymaniyah Province League

Duhok Province League

Kirkuk Province League

Mosul Province League

Saladin Province League

Diyala Province League

Anbar Province League

Muthanna Province League

Karbala Province League

Babylon Province League

Wasit Province League

Najaf Province League

Qādisiyyah Province League

Dhi Qar Province League

Maysan Province League

Basra Province League

Baghdad Province League

See also
 Iraqi Premier League
 Iraqi Super Cup
 Iraq FA Cup

References

External links
 Iraq Football Association

Football leagues in Iraq
Third level football leagues in Asia
Sports leagues established in 1974